Oliver Harold Gregory (28 January 1917 – 16 June 2001) was an Australian politician.

He was born in Launceston. In 1959 he was elected to the Tasmanian Legislative Council as the independent member for Westmorland. He served until his retirement in 1985.

References

1917 births
2001 deaths
Independent members of the Parliament of Tasmania
Members of the Tasmanian Legislative Council
20th-century Australian politicians